Raghu Sharma (born 11 March 1993) is an Indian cricketer. He made his first-class debut for Punjab in the 2017–18 Ranji Trophy on 14 October 2017. He made his Twenty20 debut on 11 January 2021, for Puducherry in the 2020–21 Syed Mushtaq Ali Trophy.

References

External links
 

1993 births
Living people
Indian cricketers
Place of birth missing (living people)
Pondicherry cricketers
Punjab, India cricketers